Walkden railway station serves the town of Walkden in City of Salford, Greater Manchester, England on the Manchester to Southport Line. It was opened by the Lancashire and Yorkshire Railway

One of the busier stations on the line, the station used to be known as Walkden High Level to differentiate it from the London and North Western Railway's Walkden Low Level railway station (on the line from Manchester Exchange to Bolton Great Moor Street, which was closed to passengers in 1954). It controlled a junction for the goods line to Ellesmere Colliery. 

First opened in 1888 with the line, it has only ever had two platform faces - when the line was quadrupled at the turn of the century, the two additional tracks were laid to the south and were not provided with platforms. The fast lines were subsequently decommissioned in November 1965 and lifted.

In February 2007 the Friends of Walkden Station community volunteer group was founded to campaign for improvements to the station's facilities and services.

One of the line's two remaining signal boxes was formerly located here (it acted as the 'fringe' box to Manchester Piccadilly signalling centre), but it and neighbouring Atherton Goods Yard box were both closed in the spring of 2013 and their semaphore signals replaced by colour lights worked from Piccadilly SCC.

Facilities
The station has a staffed ticket office, though this is only staffed part-time (06:10 to 12:40 weekdays, 07:10 to 13:40 Saturdays, closed Sundays).  A ticket machine is also available.  Train running information is provided by digital display screens, automated announcements and timetable posters.  No step-free access is possible, as the station is above street level and is reached via two flights of stairs.

Service

Only one train per day (weekdays and Saturdays) continues to  since the summer 2019 timetable change. All Sunday services continue to Southport.

On 18 December 2009 the Greater Manchester Passenger Transport Executive (GMPTE) voted to approve funding for a one-year trial of Sunday trains from Walkden, starting on 23 May 2010.  This proved successful and now runs twice per hour in each direction (one Blackburn to Southport train and a second between Wigan and Manchester Victoria).

References

External links

 Photo by Keith Palin
 Friends of Walkden Station campaign website.

Railway stations in Salford
DfT Category E stations
Former Lancashire and Yorkshire Railway stations
Northern franchise railway stations
Railway stations in Great Britain opened in 1888